A leadership election for the Civic Democratic Party (ODS)  was held on 23 November 1991. Václav Klaus was confirmed as the leader of ODS. 327 delegates voted for him while 14 voted against him.

Results

References

1991 November
1991 elections in Czechoslovakia
1991 11 Civic Democratic Party
Elections in Plzeň
Civic Democratic Party leadership election